FC Boisbriand was a Canadian semi-professional soccer club based in Boisbriand, Quebec that played in the Première Ligue de soccer du Québec.

History
The club was originally formed in 1977.

In 2012, the semi-professional club was established to play in the newly formed Première Ligue de soccer du Québec, a Division III league, as one of the founding members. Their home field was located at Parc Régional 640. They played their first match on May 6, at home, against FC L'Assomption. They had a rivalry with A.S. Blainville, with both clubs being from the Laurentides region. After the 2013 season, they withdrew from the league, having failed to meet league regulations.

At the end of 2019, the club merged with three other local clubs - FC St-Eustache, Shamrocks TC and Phénix de Saint-Joseph-du-Lac - to form Club Revolution FC.

Seasons

Notable former players
The following players have either played at the professional or international level, either before or after playing for the PLSQ team:

References

Soccer clubs in Quebec
Boisbriand
Association football clubs established in 1977
1977 establishments in Quebec
Boisbriand